The Polish Academy Award for Best Supporting Actress is an annual award given to the best supporting actress in Polish movie.

Winners and nominees

References

External links
 Polish Film Awards; Official website 

Film awards for supporting actress
Polish film awards
Awards established in 2000